Todd Anthony Greene (born May 8, 1971) is a former Major League Baseball catcher. In an 11-year career, he played for the Anaheim Angels (–), Toronto Blue Jays (2000), New York Yankees, Texas Rangers (–), Colorado Rockies (–), and San Francisco Giants. He batted and threw right-handed.

Amateur career
Greene was born in Augusta, Georgia, and attended Evans High School in Evans, GA and went on to attend Georgia Southern University. While playing for the Eagles, he was named the TAAC Player of the Year in 1990. In 1992, he played collegiate summer baseball in the Cape Cod Baseball League for the Yarmouth-Dennis Red Sox, where he won the league's annual all-star game home run hitting contest. Greene finished his college career 3rd on the all-time home run list at 88. He was selected by the Angels in the 12th round of the 1993 MLB Draft.

Professional career
Greene made his major league debut for the Angels in 1996. His most productive season with the Angels came in 1999, when he played in 97 games for the big league club.

With the Yankees in 2001, he caught the ceremonial first pitch thrown by President George W. Bush prior to Game 3 of the 2001 World Series.

On May 4, 2006, while playing for the Giants in a game against the Milwaukee Brewers, Greene was seriously injured in a home-plate collision with Brewers' first baseman Prince Fielder.  While Greene continued to play for the rest of the season, his shoulder had suffered serious structural damage.  During spring training the next season, while with the San Diego Padres, Greene tore two muscles in his weakened rotator cuff while attempting a throw to second base.  He never returned to the majors following the injury.

Coaching, scouting and front office career
In , he was a scout for the San Diego Padres. In January , he was named a quality assurance coach for the Tampa Bay Rays.

On November 23, 2009, Greene joined the Seattle Mariners as a Major League scout. In  he then became the Special Assistant to the General Manager, handling trades and acquisitions for the Arizona Diamondbacks.

References

External links

1971 births
Living people
American expatriate baseball players in Canada
Anaheim Angels players
Arizona Diamondbacks scouts
Baseball players at the 1991 Pan American Games
Baseball players from Augusta, Georgia
Boise Hawks players
California Angels players
Colorado Rockies players
Colorado Springs Sky Sox players
Columbus Clippers players
Dunedin Blue Jays players
Edmonton Trappers players
Frisco RoughRiders players
Georgia Southern Eagles baseball players
Lake Elsinore Storm players
Las Vegas 51s players
Major League Baseball catchers
Midland Angels players
New York Yankees players
Oklahoma RedHawks players
Pan American Games bronze medalists for the United States
Pan American Games medalists in baseball
People from Evans, Georgia
San Francisco Giants players
Seattle Mariners scouts
Syracuse SkyChiefs players
Texas Rangers players
Toronto Blue Jays players
Vancouver Canadians players
Yarmouth–Dennis Red Sox players
Medalists at the 1991 Pan American Games